Academia El Tango Argentino (English: The Argentine Tango Academy) is a 1942 black and white Argentine  musical romantic drama film directed and written by Julio Irigoyen and written by Julio Porter. It stars Warly Ceriani and Domingo Conte. The movie was filmed in Buenos Aires, Argentina.

The film is about tango dancing, an integral part of Argentine culture.

Cast
Warly Ceriani
Domingo Conte
Ada Cornaro
Elisa Labardén
Tino Tori
Herminia Velich

External links
 
Academia El Tango Argentino at Freebase

Argentine musical drama films
1942 films
Argentine black-and-white films
1940s Spanish-language films
Tango films
Films directed by Julio Irigoyen
1942 romantic drama films
1940s romantic musical films
Argentine dance films
1940s dance films
Argentine romantic musical films
1940s musical drama films
Argentine romantic drama films
1940s Argentine films